Patian is a village of Abbottabad District in Khyber Pakhtunkhwa province of Pakistan. It is located at 34°7'15N 73°5'55E with an altitude of 958 metres (3146 feet). Neighbouring settlements include Chamhad, Shadial and Bagwal Bandi

References

Populated places in Abbottabad District